The 1998 Asian Super Cup was the 4th Asian Super Cup, a football match played between the winners of the previous season's Asian Club Championship and Asian Cup Winners Cup competitions. The 1998 competition was contested by Pohang Steelers of South Korea, who won the 1997–98 Asian Club Championship, and Al Nassr of Saudi Arabia, the winners of the 1997–98 Asian Cup Winners' Cup.

Route to the Super Cup

Pohang Steelers 

1Pohang Steelers goals always recorded first.

Al Nasr 

1 Al Nasr goals always recorded first. 
1 Al Shabab withdrew.

Game summary 

|}

First leg

Second leg

References
 Asian Super Cup 1998 (AFC)
 Asian Super Cup 1998 (RSSSF)

Asian Super Cup
Super
International club association football competitions hosted by Saudi Arabia
International club association football competitions hosted by South Korea
S
Al Nassr FC matches